The 1990 Lipton International Players Championships was a tennis tournament played on outdoor hard courts. It was the 6th edition of the Miami tournament, and was part of the ATP Super 9 of the 1990 ATP Tour, and of the Tier I Series of the 1990 WTA Tour. Both the men's and the women's events took place at the Tennis Center at Crandon Park in Key Biscayne, Florida in the United States, from March 12 through March 26, 1990.

The men's field was headlined by World No. 1, Australian Open champion, Milan, Toronto indoor, 1989 Key Biscayne winner Ivan Lendl, Brussels titlist, US Open and Wimbledon defending champion Boris Becker and Australian Open finalist, Indian Wells winner Stefan Edberg. Other top players in the field were Rotterdam titlist Brad Gilbert, San Francisco winner Andre Agassi, Aaron Krickstein, Jay Berger and Tim Mayotte.

Finals

Men's singles

 Andre Agassi defeated  Stefan Edberg 6–1, 6–4, 0–6, 6–2
It was Andre Agassi's 2nd title of the year and his 10th overall. It was his 1st career Masters title.

Women's singles

 Monica Seles defeated  Judith Wiesner 6–1, 6–2
It was Monica Seles' 1st title of the year and her 2nd overall. It was her 1st career Tier I title.

Men's doubles

 Rick Leach /  Jim Pugh defeated  Boris Becker /  Cássio Motta 6–4, 3–6, 6–3

Women's doubles

 Jana Novotná /  Helena Suková defeated  Betsy Nagelsen /  Robin White 6–4, 6–3

External links
Association of Tennis Professionals (ATP) singles draw
Association of Tennis Professionals (ATP) doubles draw
WTA Tour final results: 1971–2007
1990 Main Draw